AHE or Ahe may refer to:

Language
 Ahe language (ISO-639-3 code), a Land Dayak language (or dialect of Kendayan)
 Alternate name of the Native American Gros Ventre language
 Age, in Inari Sami
 Ahe (アヘ), a Japanese onomatopoeia describing a female's flushed breath/moan and sexual excitement, used in ahegao ("weird face")

Other uses
 Ahe, an atoll in the Tuamotu Archipelago
 Ahe Airport (IATA code AHE)
 Adaptive histogram equalization
 Ahepe (House of the Ahe), village near Togo, Africa
 Alberta Hospital Edmonton, Canada
 Association for the Healthcare Environment, American Hospital Association membership group

See also
 AHED (company), a Canadian company
 Ahes, a Breton magician and princess
 AH (disambiguation)
 Von der Ahe (surname)